Jakob Hurt ( in Himmaste –  in St Petersburg) was a notable Estonian folklorist, theologian, and linguist. With respect to the last, he is perhaps best known for his dissertation on "pure" -ne stem nouns ("Die estnischen Nomina auf -ne purum", 1886).

Also known as the "king of Estonian folklore", Hurt planned the publication in the 1870s of a six volume series called Monumenta Estoniae Antiquae. Hurt organised around 1400 volunteer collectors via a press campaign, who visited almost every house in Livonia collecting around 124,000 pages of folklore. Due to financial difficulties, however, only two volumes of folk songs were published in 1875–76, entitled Vana kannel (Old Zither). Two more volumes were published in 1938 and 1941. Hurt also published a three volume collection called Setukeste laulud (The Setos' Songs) between 1894 and 1907.

There are monuments to him at Tartu and in Põlva. Tartu, Põlva, Otepää and Himmaste also have a street named after him. He was also featured on the 10 krooni note.

Membership in organisations
Jakob Hurt was an honorary alumnus of the Estonian Students' Society.

Bibliography
 Rudolf Põldmäe, "Noor Jakob Hurt". Eesti Raamat, Tallinn 1988
 "Jakob Hurt 1839-1907". Koostanud Mart Laar, Rein Saukas, Ülo Tedre. Eesti Raamat, Tallinn, 1989
 Mart Laar, "Raamat Jakob Hurdast". Ilmamaa, Tartu 1995

References

External links

1839 births
1907 deaths
People from Põlva Parish
People from Kreis Werro
Estonian Lutheran clergy
Linguists from Estonia
Estonian folklorists
19th-century Estonian people
University of Tartu alumni
University of Helsinki alumni